Sheohar (pronounced Shivahar) is an administrative district in the state of Bihar in India. The district headquarters are located at Sheohar, and the district is a part of Tirhut Division.  This district was carved out of Sitamarhi district in 1994 due to the extreme efforts of Raghunath Jha, former Union Minister. Eminent Hindi Novelist, Dr. Bhagwati Sharan Mishra was the first District magistrate of Sheohar.
Sivas used to have a guest house in the Mehsi town of his time, which is still located in the name of Raja Bazar in East Champaran.The district occupies an area of 443 km² and has a population of 656,246 (as of 2011). Sheohar is known for its greenery and cleanliness. Cadamba and teak are the principal trees of this district. Nilgai or blue bull is the regional animal of this area.

Its name is derived from two words, Shiva(शिव) and Har(हर), these both are names of Lord Shiva, it is named so due to the large number of temples in the city. Agriculture is the mainstay. It is one of the most flood-affected districts in Bihar, due to over flooding of the Bagmati and Budhi Gandak rivers. Devkuli is a holy place popular for ancient temple of Lord Shiva. As of 2011 it is the second least populous district of Bihar (out of 39), after Sheikhpura.

Geography
It is bordered by three districts from north and east Sitamarhi, from west East Champaran and from south Muzaffarpur.

Politics 
  

|}

Economy
 
In 2006 the Ministry of Panchayati Raj named Sheohar one of the country's 250 most backward districts (out of a total of 640). It is one of the 36 districts in Bihar currently receiving funds from the Backward Regions Grant Fund Programme (BRGF).

Sub-divisions
The district comprises only one sub-division, namely, Sheohar, which is further divided into five blocks: Sheohar, Tariyani, Piprahi, Dumri-katsari, Purnahiya.

Demographics

According to the 2011 census Sheohar district has a population of 656,246, roughly equal to the nation of Montenegro or the US state of Vermont. This gives it a ranking of 511th in India (out of a total of 640). Rampur Kesho is a village known for its highest illiteracy rate. Its population growth rate over the decade 2001-2011 was 27.32%. Sheohar has a sex ratio of 890 females for every 1000 males, and a literacy rate of 72%. 4.29% of the population lives in urban areas. Scheduled Castes and Scheduled Tribes made up 14.73% and 0.05% of the population respectively.

At the time of the 2011 Census of India, 22.97% of the population in the district spoke Hindi and 7.78% Urdu as their first language. 68.70% of the population recorded their first language as a dialect classified as Other Hindi on the census. The main language of the region is Bajjika.

Politicians
 Thakur Jugal Kishore Sinha , Freedom Fighter, Member 1st Lok Sabha, popularly known as the father of Cooperative Movement 
 Ram Dulari Sinha, Freedom Fighter, Former Union Minister & Governor
 Raghunath Jha, Former Union Minister, maker of Sheohar District
 Hari Kishore Singh, Former Ambassador of Syria
 Anwarul Haque, Former MP of Sheohar
 Sitaram Singh, Former MP of Sheohar
 Rama Devi, Current MP of Sheohar

References

External links 
 Official website

 
Tirhut division
Districts of Bihar
1994 establishments in Bihar